Piano Sonata No. 2 may refer to:

 Piano Sonata No. 2 (Beethoven)
 Piano Sonata No. 2 (Brahms)
 Piano Sonata No. 2 (Chopin)
 Piano Sonata No. 2 (Hindemith)
 Piano Sonata No. 2 (Ives)
 Piano Sonata No. 2 (Kabalevsky)
 Piano Sonata No. 2 (Mozart)
 Piano Sonata No. 2 (Prokofiev)
 Piano Sonata No. 2 (Rachmaninoff)
 Piano Sonata No. 2 (Scriabin)
 Piano Sonata No. 2 (Schumann)
 Piano Sonata No. 2 (Sessions)
 Piano Sonata No. 2 (Shostakovich)
 Piano Sonata No. 2 (Szymanowski)
 Piano Sonata No. 2 (Tchaikovsky)
 Piano Sonata No. 2 (Weber)

See also
 Cello Sonata No. 2 (disambiguation)
 Violin Sonata No. 2 (disambiguation)